WLTU (92.1 FM) is a radio station broadcasting a country music format. Licensed to Manitowoc, Wisconsin, United States, the station is currently owned by Mark Seehafer through licensee Seehafer Broadcasting Corp.

References

External links

LTU
Country radio stations in the United States